HackWeiser is an underground hacking group and hacking magazine founded in 1999. In early-2001 the founder and leader, p4ntera, left the group with saying very little.

In April 2001 Hackweiser claimed credit with the start of Project China. The project was a focus of hack attacks based at Mainland Chinese computer systems.

The group has appeared in the news due to having defaced well known websites, including websites owned by Microsoft, Sony, Walmart, Girlscouts of America, Jenny Craig, DARE, Nellis Air Force Base aka Area 51, CyberNanny. and countless others. They have been noted by the US Attorney's Bulletin in reference to "Responsible hackers". They have won multiple categories in the "State of the Hack Awards"

The members of the groups were a mix of Grey hat and Black Hat hackers.

Members included;

The group eventually fell apart and disbanded after the arrest of Hackah Jak in mid-2003. 
Although reports still indicate that many ex-members are active on the underground.

.

References

Hacker groups